Robert William Summerhays (March 19, 1927 – May 4, 2017) was a National Football League American football linebacker and fullback for the Green Bay Packers.  Summerhays played collegiate ball for Army and the University of Utah before being drafted by Green Bay Packers in the 4th round of the 1949 NFL Draft.  He played professionally in the NFL for three seasons and retired in 1951.

References

External links

1927 births
2017 deaths
Players of American football from Salt Lake City
American football linebackers
American football fullbacks
Army Black Knights football players
Utah Utes football players
Green Bay Packers players